Eleven Questions (2007) is international collaboration of Robert Rich and Markus Reuter which was conceived, composed and recorded in person in one intense week at Rich’s Soundscape studio in California. Rich then completed, mixed and mastered the work over the subsequent two months.

Track listing
”Reminder” – 3:27
”Reductive” – 4:27
”Recall” – 2:24
”Retention” – 6:34
”Remote” – 4:16
”Reluctant” – 3:27
”Redemption” – 6:41
”Relative” – 3:27 
”Reception” – 3:04 
”Refuge” – 5:53
”Refuse” – 3:43
”Rebirth” – 3:26
”Remainder” – 2:12

Personnel
Markus Reuter – touch guitar, acoustic guitar, piano
Robert Rich – sound design, piano, flutes, lap steel guitar
SiRenée – voices
Recorded at Soundscape Studio, Mountain View, California
Mixed and mastered by Robert Rich
Composed by Markus Reuter and Robert Rich
Photography by Brad Cole
Design by John Bergin
Special thanks to Metasonix, Haroun Serang, Bernhard Wöstheinrich, Dixie, Synthesis Technology and many others

Robert Rich (musician) albums
2007 albums